36th NSFC Awards
January 4, 2002

Best Film: 
 Mulholland Dr. 

The 36th National Society of Film Critics Awards, given on 4 January 2002, honored the best in film for 2001.

Winners

Best Picture 
1. Mulholland Drive
2. Gosford Park
3. The Lord of the Rings: The Fellowship of the Ring

Best Director 
1. Robert Altman – Gosford Park
2. David Lynch – Mulholland Drive
3. Peter Jackson – The Lord of the Rings: The Fellowship of the Ring

Best Actor 
1. Gene Hackman – The Royal Tenenbaums
2. Denzel Washington – Training Day
3. Tom Wilkinson – In the Bedroom

Best Actress 
1. Naomi Watts – Mulholland Drive
2. Sissy Spacek – In the Bedroom
3. Charlotte Rampling – Under the Sand (Sous le sable)

Best Supporting Actor 
1. Steve Buscemi – Ghost World
2. Ben Kingsley – Sexy Beast
3. Brian Cox – L.I.E.

Best Supporting Actress 
1. Helen Mirren – Gosford Park
2. Maggie Smith – Gosford Park
3. Marisa Tomei – In the Bedroom

Best Screenplay 
1. Julian Fellowes – Gosford Park
2. Daniel Clowes and Terry Zwigoff – Ghost World
3. Christopher Nolan – Memento

Best Cinematography 
1. Christopher Doyle and Mark Lee Ping Bin – In the Mood for Love (Faa yeung nin wa)
2. Peter Deming – Mulholland Drive
3. Roger Deakins – The Man Who Wasn't There

Best Foreign Language Film 
1. In the Mood for Love (Faa yeung nin wa)
2. The Circle (Dayereh)
3. Amores perros

Best Non-Fiction Film 
1. The Gleaners and I (Les glaneurs et la glaneuse)
2. The Endurance: Shackleton's Legendary Antarctic Expedition
3. My Voyage to Italy (Il mio viaggio in Italia)

Experimental Film Award 
 Waking Life

Film Heritage Award 
 My Voyage to Italy (Il mio viaggio in Italia)

Special Citation 
 Faith Hubley

References

External links
 Past Awards

2001 film awards
2001
2002 in American cinema